Saint John Houghton Catholic Voluntary Academy (commonly known as Saint John Houghton)  (formerly St John Houghton Catholic School and the Blessed John Houghton Catholic School) is a mixed Roman Catholic secondary school located in Kirk Hallam (near Ilkeston) in the English county of Derbyshire. The school is named after Saint John Houghton, a Carthusian hermit and Catholic priest who was the first English Catholic martyr to die as a result of the Act of Supremacy by King Henry VIII of England.

It was established as a voluntary aided school in January 1965 called The Blessed John Houghton Catholic School. The school was converted to academy status on 1 March 2012 and was renamed Saint John Houghton Catholic Voluntary Academy. The school was previously administered as part of the Saint Robert Lawrence Catholic Academy Trust, which also included three nearby primary schools. The Saint Robert Lawrence Catholic Academy Trust was overseen by the Roman Catholic Diocese of Nottingham.

In 2018, the school, along with 4 other secondary schools and 20 primary schools, became part of the Saint Ralph Sherwin Catholic Multi Academy Trust.

St John Houghton Catholic Voluntary Academy offers GCSEs and OCR Nationals as programmes of study for pupils. The school gained specialist status as a Science College in 2005, and continues to specialise in science.

References

External links
St John Houghton Catholic Voluntary Academy official website

Secondary schools in Derbyshire
Catholic secondary schools in the Diocese of Nottingham
Educational institutions established in 1965
1965 establishments in England
Academies in Derbyshire